The 2018 NBA 2K League season was the inaugural season of the NBA 2K League, an esports league based on the basketball video game series NBA 2K. The season opened with the Tip-Off Tournament, which ran from May 1–5, 2018, where 76ers GC defeated Blazer5 Gaming. The season culminated on August 25, 2018, when Knicks Gaming defeated Heat Check Gaming in a best-of-three finals to become the first playoff champions in league history. Other tournaments included The Turn (where Blazer5 Gaming defeated Celtics Crossover Gaming) and The Ticket (where Knicks Gaming defeated Celtics Crossover Gaming).

Qualifying
For the inaugural season, the qualifying stage was open to anyone who was 18+ years old and owned NBA 2K18 on either PlayStation 4 or Xbox One. To qualify, players had to win 50 games in NBA 2K18s Pro-Am mode and submit an application following this requirement between January 1–31, 2018. Following that, the players who qualified participated in a combine that ran from February 2–21, 2018. The top 102 players out of the 72,000 who qualified were then drafted on April 4.

Teams
On December 11, 2017, the official logo for the NBA 2K League was revealed, with the logos for each of the 17 teams being revealed over the course of the following days.

Inaugural draft
On April 4, 2018, the inaugural draft took place and was broadcast on NBA TV (first round only) and Twitch. The draft used a snake draft format with NBA Commissioner Adam Silver announcing the first pick,  NBA 2K League managing director Brendan Donohue announcing the rest of the picks. The draft took place in the Hulu Theater at Madison Square Garden. For the first five rounds, each team was required to choose one player at each position, and in the sixth round team were allowed to choose any remaining player, regardless of their position.

Draft lottery
A non-weighted lottery took place on March 13, 2018, to determine the order of the draft.

Standings

Regular season
"Seeding Hierarchy" (all based on regular season games)
Win–loss record
Head-to-head matchup
Average point differential
Total points scored
Coin flipNote: Knicks Gaming automatically clinched a playoff berth by winning The Ticket tournament.

Tournaments
Tip Off Tournament
Prize Pool:
1st: $35,000
2nd: $25,000
3rd and 4th: $10,000
Group Winners: $5,000Total: $100,000MVP: Radiant (76ers GC)

The Turn
Prize Pool:
1st: $75,600
2nd: $24,800
3rd and 4th: $12,800
5th–8th: $6,000Total: $150,000MVP: Mama Im Dat Man (Blazer5 Gaming)

The Ticket
Prize Pool:
1st: $75,600
2nd: $24,800
3rd and 4th: $12,800
5th–8th: $6,000Total: $150,000MVP: iamadamthe1st (Knicks Gaming)

PostseasonFinals MVP:' NateKahl (Knicks Gaming)

Awards

References

External links
Official website

NBA
NBA 2K League